The Anderson County Review is a local weekly newspaper for Garnett, Kansas with a circulation of about 3,000. The newspaper also maintains an online presence.

2020 cartoon controversy 

In 2020, the newspaper published to its Facebook page a cartoon criticizing Kansas's mask policy against the COVID-19 pandemic in which Democratic Governor Laura Kelly is shown against a backdrop of a Holocaust train with the caption of "Lockdown Laura says: Put on your mask ... and step onto the cattle car," seemingly implying the mask order was a prelude to ethnic cleansing.  Kelly was also depicted with a prominent Star of David.  The Review and its owner Dane Hicks were criticized for the cartoon by Kelly as well as others for being anti-Semitic and trivializing the Holocaust.  Hicks refused to back down or apologize, saying that there was nobody to apologize to and that "Facebook is a cesspool".

References

External links
 

Newspapers published in Kansas
Anderson County, Kansas
Publications established in 1865
1865 establishments in Kansas